Chaetosomatidae is a small family of beetles, in the superfamily Cleroidea. There are three extant genera, two of which (Chaetosoma and Chaetosomodes) are endemic to New Zealand with the other (Malgassochaetus) native to Madagascar. Members of this family are predaceous on wood-boring insects.

Taxonomy
 Genus Chaetosoma Westwood, 1851
 Chaetosoma colossa Opitz, 2010
 Chaetosoma scaritides Westwood, 1851
 Genus Chaetosomodes Broun, 1921
 Chaetosomodes halli Broun, 1921
 Genus Malgassochaetus Ekis & Menier, 1980
 Malgassochaetus cordicollis (Menier & Ekis, 1982)
 Malgassochaetus crowsoni Ekis & Menier, 1980
 Malgassochaetus descarpentriesi Ekis & Menier, 1980
 Malgassochaetus pauliani Ekis & Menier, 1980
 Malgassochaetus penicillatus Menier & Ekis, 1982
 Malgassochaetus quadraticollis (Menier & Ekis, 1982)
 Malgassochaetus sogai Menier, 1991
 Malgassochaetus viettei Menier & Ekis, 1982
Genetic studies have suggested that Metaxina should also be considered a member of Chaetosomatidae, rather than constituting its own family.

References

 
Polyphaga families